No. 125 Helicopter Squadron  (Gladiators) is a fighter squadron and is equipped with Apache AH-64E and based at Pathankot Air Force Station.

History
The first Attack Helicopter Squadron of IAF was raised as 125 Helicopter Squadron on 1 November 1983 and equipped with Mi-25 helicopter Gunships. The squadron was reequipped with Mi-35 in April 1990.
On 3 September 2019, the squadron formally inducted the first batch of AH-64E Apache helicopters into the Indian Air Force.

Assignments
IPKF Jaffna Operations
DRC Peacekeeping Mission

Aircraft

References

125